Pollenia pediculata is a species of cluster fly in the family Polleniidae.

Distribution
It is found across Eurasia and has been introduced to South Africa, Australasia, New Zealand and North America.

References

Polleniidae
Insects described in 1834
Diptera of Europe
Diptera of Asia